"Walking Backwards" is the third single from The Futureheads' third studio album, This Is Not The World, which was released on 4 August 2008.

Track listings
7" single
 "Walking Backwards"
 "This Is Not The World (Live @ Kings College)"

Digital download
 "Walking Backwards"
 "This Is Not The World (Live @ Kings College)"
 "Everything's Changing (Live @ Kings College)"
 "Broke Up The Time (Live @ Kings College)"

Music video
The single's music video was released 26 August 2008. The video features "puppet" versions of the band members performing the song.

References

The Futureheads songs
2008 singles
2008 songs
Songs written by Ross Millard